The .22 Winchester Magnum Rimfire, also called .22 WMR, .22 Magnum, .22 WMRF, .22 MRF, or .22 Mag, is a rimfire cartridge.

History
The .22 WMR was introduced in 1959 by Winchester, but was not used by Winchester until the Winchester Model 61 slide rifle could be chambered for it in 1960. The first rifle to be offered in the new chambering was the Marlin Levermatic rifle in 1959, because its design was easily modified to accept the more powerful cartridge. By the time of the introduction of the Winchester 61, Smith & Wesson and Ruger had revolvers for it, and Savage had come out with the Model 24 and since late 2012, the Model 42, a more modern update than the 24, a .22/.410 rifle/shotgun combination gun. It was the only successful rimfire cartridge introduced in the 20th century.

Dimensions and loading
The .22 WMR uses a larger case than the more popular .22 Long Rifle (LR) both in diameter and length. The .22 WMR case is a lengthened version of the older .22 WRF and both of these cartridges have the bullet seated within the case, instead of using a heeled bullet as in the .22 LR. A .22 WMR round will not fit into the chamber of a .22 LR firearm due to the greater length and width of the magnum case. 

Although the bullet diameters are the same, the larger .22 WMR chamber does not support the smaller .22 LR cartridge.  Firing the smaller .22 LR round in a .22 WMR chamber results in swollen or split cartridge cases, high-pressure gas leakage from the rear of the chamber, and bullets striking the chamber throat out of alignment, which can result in injury to the shooter or bystander and which does result in poor ammunition performance.  

Gun makers offer .22 revolver models with cylinders chambered either in .22 LR or in .22 WMR and as convertible kits with both cylinders which allow the shooter to easily switch calibers on the same firearm.

Uses
Since the .22 WMR uses bullets comparable in weight to the .22 Long Rifle, but is considerably faster, it shoots flatter and farther and hits harder at all ranges. The same  bullet from a .22 WMR at  still has 50% more kinetic energy than .22 LR at the muzzle. The .22 WMR provides improved penetration and more reliable expansion at longer ranges with expanding bullets.

This makes the .22 WMR an effective short to medium-range varmint rifle and hunting rifle cartridge. The .22 WMR can effectively kill small game such as rabbits, hares, groundhogs, prairie dogs, foxes, raccoons, opossums, and coyotes. The relatively quiet report and negligible recoil also make it a very pleasant target and plinking round to shoot for extended periods.

Firearms using .22 WMR
It first appeared in the Marlin Model 57M Levermatic carbines in 1959, which was followed by the .22 WMR over .410 gauge Savage Model 24 combination gun, followed by Winchester's own Model 61 and 275 pump-action rifles and Model 255 lever-action rifle. The Chiappa Double Badger combination gun also comes with a .22 WMR over .410 gauge option. The Springfield Armory M6 Scout is also made in .22 Magnum over .410 gauge. The Chiappa M6 Survival Gun is similar combination gun that comes with a 12 gauge or 20 gauge shotgun barrel over a .22 Magnum barrel.

A number of single-shot and repeating rifles were offered in .22 WMR. The .22 WMR operates at pressures beyond what normal blowback actions typically handle, but the self-loading Jefferson Model 159 was introduced for the cartridge. Until the 1990s, most .22 WMR firearms were bolt-action rifles. In 1977-1985 Harrington & Richardson produced the first American-made semi-automatic .22 WMR. In the 1990s semi-automatic .22 WMR rifles were also introduced by Ruger (10/22) and Marlin, and are currently produced by Remington (Model 597) and Tanfoglio Appeal Rifle as well as the Excel Arms Accelerator Rifle and Savage arms A22 magnum.

Revolvers in .22 WMR are made by Smith & Wesson, Colt, Taurus, North American Arms, Heritage Arms, and Sturm Ruger. Semi-automatic pistols for this cartridge are (or were) produced by Kel-Tec, Grendel and AMT, the latter two now defunct (AMT has been since resurrected by High Standard). The Grendel, AMT and Kel-Tec designs used specially designed chambers with flutes or gas ports, designed to lubricate the long, thin cartridge with gases from the chamber, overcoming the Blish effect and allowing easy extraction of the cartridge.  High-Standard produced various models and versions of their classic two-shot over/under derringer in both .22 WMR and .22 LR.

The Marlin Model 25MG is a smooth bore, eight-shot, magazine-fed, .22 WMR, bolt-action shotgun manufactured by Marlin firearms Company. It was specifically designed to use snake shot, and marketed as a "garden gun" for use in dispatching small garden and farm pests. It has an effective range of about 15 yards when using snake shot. Based on earlier Marlin .22 caliber designs, the garden gun was equipped with a high-visibility front sight but no rear sight.

The Argentine EDDA submachine gun uses the .22 WMR round.

In 2014  Kel-Tec released the CMR-30, a PDW-style rifle chambered in 22. WMR with a 16" barrel and a 1:14 twist rate. It uses the same double stack 30-round magazine as the PMR-30.

In 2018 Standard Manufacturing introduced an 8-round .22 WMR revolver at the Las Vegas Shot Show. The revolver was originally introduced as the Volleyfire. The gun has side-by-side barrels, and fires 2 rounds of .22 WMR (1 bullet per barrel) with every pull of the trigger. In 2019 the gun went into production and was renamed "Thunderstruck".

In recent years, a few UK companies such as Guncraft Ltd have been making semi-automatic AR-15-style rifles chambered in 22 WMR, marketed to civilian shooters who, due to the UK's restrictive gun laws, do not have access to self-loading center-fire rifles.

Ammunition

The .22 WMR is an enlarged, more powerful version of the much earlier .22 WRF. Despite frequent claims to the contrary, it  cannot be safely used in any firearm except those specifically chambered for it. Even firearms chambered for the .22 WRF are not suitable; for one thing, the case lengths are different, and the fact that the cartridge fits into the chamber does not guarantee that using the wrong cartridge is either safe or effective.

The .22 WMR was for a time the most powerful rimfire round available; it even outperformed the .22 WCF.  It has since been eclipsed in velocity and overall kinetic energy by the .17 Winchester Super Magnum.

Commonly available in retail stores, the selection and availability of the .22 WMR nevertheless do not match the popular .22 Long Rifle.  Furthermore, .22 WMR is typically much more expensive than .22 LR per round, though it is comparable to .17 HMR, which is much more similar in overall performance, and is less expensive than .22 caliber centerfire ammunition.

Because many of the rifles that are chambered for the .22 WMR have tubular magazines, the bullet noses generally are flat or at least blunt to allow smooth feeding and reduce damage to the bullet. Although a pointed bullet in a rimfire cartridge will not contact the primer of the round in front of it (which is a hazard with centerfire cartridges in a tubular magazine), the manufacturer's stamp is in the middle of the base of a rimfire cartridge, and this may interfere with pointed metal bullets in a tube. However, Remington, CCI, and Hornady now produce bullet designs with 30 or  polymer plastic ballistic tips that reduce the hazards of pointed ammunition in tubular magazines.

Bullets for the .22 WMR are generally unlubricated lead with heavy copper plating, in either solid nose or hollow point style designed for small game hunting or pest control (varmint hunting).

The limited selection of commercial ammunition for the .22 WMR has inspired specialist wildcatters to select the .22 WMR case for handloading high performance rimfire ammunition. Generally they load the wildcat cartridges with pointed bullets for the aerodynamic advantages, using the same bullets as those in .22 caliber centerfire cartridges. Though such bullets are generally heavier than standard .22 WMR, the sharp nose and tapered tail conserve energy better, delivering greater impact at longer ranges.

Other wildcatters neck the .22 WMR down to smaller calibers, such as .20 (5 mm) and .17 (4.5 mm) or even smaller, in an attempt to get maximum velocity and the flattest possible trajectory. An example of such an experimental design is the Swedish 4.5×26mm MKR.

See also
 .22 BB
 .22 CB
 .22 Short
 .22 Long
 .22 Extra Long
 .22 Long Rifle
 .22 Hornet
 5 mm caliber
 List of handgun cartridges
 List of rifle cartridges
 List of rimfire cartridges
 Table of handgun and rifle cartridges

References

Further reading
 Barnes, Frank C., ed. by John T. Amber. ".22 Winchester Magnum Rimfire", in Cartridges of the World, pp. 275. Northfield, IL: DBI Books, 1972. .
 Cartridges of the World 11th Edition, Book by Frank C. Barnes, Edited by Stan Skinner, Gun Digest Books, 2006,  p. 479

External links

 Chuck Hawks' page on the .22 WMR
 Chuck Hawks on .22 WMR ammunition selection
 The .22 WMR TODAY, Guns Magazine, June, 2001 by C. Rodney James
 Three .22 WMR Loads From Remington, Handguns Magazine, by Phil W. Johnston
 Reloading Techniques: .22 Win. Magnum Rimfire, Performance Shooter, April 1996

Pistol and rifle cartridges
Rimfire cartridges
Winchester Magnum rifle cartridges
Weapons and ammunition introduced in 1959